The Neptun-class submarine was a Swedish submarine class built by Kockums. The first submarine was launched in 1942 and a total of three submarines were built: HMSwS Neptun, HMSwS Najad and HMSwS Nacken.  The class was decommissioned in 1966.

Ships

References

 

Submarine classes
Submarines of the Swedish Navy